Royal Air Force Wickenby or RAF Wickenby was a purpose-built Royal Air Force station constructed late 1942 and early 1943.

Construction
It had two T2 type hangars and one B1 type. The B1 and one of the T2 hangars can still be seen on the airfield site. The T2 near the threshold of runway 21 was recently acquired by the airfield owners and after many years of industrial use is now, once more, an aircraft hangar.

A number of the buildings were to the east (Communal Site, Living Quarters, WAAF Quarters) and stretched to and beyond the Lissington road - a road travelled many an evening by the airmen and women who visited their favourite watering hole, the White Hart at Lissington. The Sick Quarters were to the south of the airfield together with a Communal Site and Living Quarters.

Residential units

Wickenby was occupied in September 1942 by No. 12 Squadron (a/c code PH) who brought with them Vickers Wellington II/III's, but during the winter of 1942/3 they converted to the Avro Lancaster. The Squadron flew the Lancaster throughout the rest of the war. On 7 November 1943, C Flight was expanded to become 626 Squadron (a/c code UM), also flying the Lancaster. Wickenby played a large part in the bomber offensive, taking part in many of the major raids including: Berlin, Munich, Nuremberg, Essen, Mailly-le-Camp, and Caen. Aircraft from Wickenby were also involved in mine-laying (gardening), and operations Manna and Exodus. On 24 September 1945, 12 Squadron moved to a more permanent site at Binbrook.

Having spent its entire existence at Wickenby, 626 Squadron was disbanded on 14 October 1945. The base was later taken over by No. 93 Maintenance Unit and subsequently No. 92 Maintenance Unit who used the runways to dismantle ordnance until 1956 when the base was closed. Civil aviation and maintenance began in 1963, and the land was sold between 1964 and 1966. During the relatively short period of active service 1,080 people died from RAF Wickenby. This sacrifice is commemorated by the RAF Wickenby Memorial in the form of Icarus on an obelisk at the entrance to the airfield. The memorial was placed there by members of the Wickenby Register, an association of former 12/626 Squadron personnel and associate relatives.

Post-war use
The north part of the former airfield is now known as Wickenby Aerodrome, which is a grass and concrete airfield. A road from Holton cum Beckering to Snelland runs right over the former airfield. Companies based at the airfield are Thruster Aircraft who make microlight planes; Lincoln Flight who train pilots and conduct experience flights; and Rase Distribution - a haulage firm. Planes using the airfield have to make contact first with the control tower at RAF Waddington.

The Watch Office is the home of the RAF Wickenby Memorial Collection and the Wickenby Archive, a museum and collection of memorabilia and archive dedicated to the memory of the Squadrons who served here.

References
Citations

Bibliography

External links
 Wickenby Aerodrome
 UKGA
 Wartime Memories
 RAF website
 RAF Wickenby Memorial Collection - Wickenby Museum and the Wickenby Archive
 www.lesfaircloth.co.uk - The story of Leslie Faircloth and crew of 12 Squadron Bomber Command who flew around 17 operations from RAF Wickenby, mostly in Lancaster B Mk III ND424 'PH-G', during May and June 1944.

Wickenby
Wickenby
Wickenby